Friedrich Wilhelm Christian Ludwig von Jagow (8 September 1771, in Wolfshagen – 2 December 1857, in Berlin) was a Prussian General of Infantry who fought in the Napoleonic Wars.

References

 

1771 births
1857 deaths
Prussian commanders of the Napoleonic Wars
Generals of Infantry (Prussia)
Recipients of the Pour le Mérite (military class)
Military personnel from Lower Saxony